Kamak or Kamek may refer to various places in Iran:
 Kamak-e Olya, Hamadan Province
 Kamak-e Sofla, Hamadan Province
 Kamak, Kermanshah
 Kamak-e Azizollah, Kohgiluyeh and Boyer-Ahmad Province
 Kamak-e Gorg Ali, Kohgiluyeh and Boyer-Ahmad Province
 Kamak-e Khodadad, Kohgiluyeh and Boyer-Ahmad Province
 Kamak-e Khoda Rahem, Kohgiluyeh and Boyer-Ahmad Province
 Kamak-e Nad Ali, Kohgiluyeh and Boyer-Ahmad Province
 Kamak-e Rah Khoda, Kohgiluyeh and Boyer-Ahmad Province
 Kamak-e Safer, Kohgiluyeh and Boyer-Ahmad Province